Central Coalfields Limited (CCL) is a subsidiary of Coal India Limited (CIL), an undertaking of the Government of India. CCL was established in 1956 as National Coal Development Corporation Limited and is a Category-I Mini Ratna company since October 2007. CCL manages the nationalized coal mines of the Coal Mines Authority, Central division. CCL is headquartered at Darbhanga House, Ranchi, Jharkhand.

Infrastructure 
CCL owns and operates the following:

 43 operative mines (5 underground & 38 opencast)
 7 operating coalfields. These coalfields are located in East Bokaro, West Bokaro, North Karanpura, South Karanpura, Ramgarh, Giridih and Hutar.
 7 washeries
 4 operational coking coal washeries at Rajrappa, Kedla, Kathara and Sawang
 1 operational non-coking coal washery at Piparwar
 2 non operational non-coking coal washeries at Gidi and Kargali
 1 central workshop at Barkakana
 2 regional workshops at Giridih and Bhurkunda
 3 repair workshops at Jarangdih, Tapin North and Dakra

References

External links
Official website : www.centralcoalfields.in

Coal India subsidiaries
Coal companies of India
Mining in Jharkhand
Companies based in Jharkhand
Government-owned companies of India
Energy companies established in 1975
Non-renewable resource companies established in 1975
1973 establishments in Bihar
Indian companies established in 1975